This article provides details of international football games played by the Palestine national football team from 2020 to present.

Results

2020

2021

2022

2023

References

External links
 Palestine fixtures on FIFA.com
 Palestine fixtures on eloratings.net
 RSSSF: Palestine – International Results

2020s in the State of Palestine
2020-29